Beiselia is a genus of flowering plants belonging to the family Burseraceae.

Its native range is Southwestern Mexico.

Species:

Beiselia mexicana

References

Burseraceae
Burseraceae genera